Peter Webster may refer to:

 Peter Webster (artist), English artist and sculptor
 Peter Webster (footballer) (born 1932), Australian rules footballer
 Peter J. Webster (born 1942), meteorologist and climate dynamicist
 Peter Webster (judge), British barrister and judge